Nonoo is a surname. Notable people with the surname include: 

Ebrahim Daoud Nonoo, Bahraini businessman and politician
Houda Nonoo (born 1964), Bahraini diplomat
Misha Nonoo (born 1987), US-based British-Bahraini fashion designer